is a terminal railway station on the two-station Kintetsu Hachiōji Line in Yokkaichi, Mie Prefecture, Japan, operated by the private railway operator Kintetsu. It is 1.3 rail kilometers from the terminus of the Hachiōji Line at Hinaga Station and is 3.1 rail kilometers Kintetsu-Yokkaichi Station.

Lines
Kintetsu Railway
Hachiōji Line

Layout
Nishihino Station has a single side platform serving bi-directional traffic. The station is unattended.

Platforms

Adjacent stations

Surrounding area
 Yokkaichi-Minami High School
 Tempaku River

History
Nishihino Station was opened on October 14, 1912 as a station on the Mie Tramway Line, which became the Mie Railway in 1916. On February 11, 1944, due to mergers, the station came under the ownership of Sanco. In November 1944, the station was rebuilt 100 meters closer towards present-day Kintetsu Yokkaichi Station. On February 1, 1964 the Railway division of Sanco split off and formed a separate company, the Mie Electric Railway, which merged with Kintetsu on April 1, 1965. On September 25, 1974, the Kintetsu Hachiōji Line ceased operations from Hinaga Station to its terminus at Ise-Hachiōji Station after portions of the track were washed away by heavy rains. On April 1, 1976 operations resumed as far as Nishihino Station, but the remainder of the line remains closed with no plans to resume operations.

References

External links

 Kintetsu: Nishihino Station

Railway stations in Japan opened in 1912
Railway stations in Mie Prefecture